The Ndiva Women's Film Festival (NWFF) is an African film festival for women filmmakers and audiences, established in Accra, Ghana in 2017. The founder and executive director of NWFF is Aseye Tamakloe.

The first NWFF, targeted at African women filmmakers and women of African descent, ran from 1-3 November 2017. The scope of the second NWFF, held 1-3 November 2018, was widened to include women filmmakers worldwide. The opening film was The Life of Esteban by Inés Eshun  and the closing film was Potato Potahto by Shirley Frimpong Manso.

See also 
 List of women's film festivals

References

External links
 Ndiva Women's Film Festival

Women's film festivals
Film festivals in Ghana
2017 establishments in Ghana
Film festivals established in 2017
Accra